Cima dei Cogn is a mountain in the Lepontine Alps, located on the border between the cantons of Ticino and Graubünden. It lies south of the higher Cima Rossa.

References

External links
Cima dei Cogn on Hikr.org

Mountains of the Alps
Alpine three-thousanders
Mountains of Switzerland
Mountains of Ticino
Mountains of Graubünden
Graubünden–Ticino border
Lepontine Alps
Mesocco
Rossa, Switzerland